Caio Alves Roque Gomes (born 9 January 2002) is a Brazilian professional footballer who plays as a defender for Lommel.

Career statistics

Club

References

2002 births
Living people
Brazilian footballers
Association football defenders
Challenger Pro League players
CR Flamengo footballers
Lommel S.K. players
Brazilian expatriate footballers
Brazilian expatriate sportspeople in Belgium
Expatriate footballers in Belgium
Brazil youth international footballers
Sportspeople from Salvador, Bahia